Santa Rita is one of the 4 subbarrios of Hato Rey Sur, itself one of 18 barrios of the municipality of San Juan, Puerto Rico.

The office of Amnesty International in Puerto Rico is located in Santa Rita.

References

Hato Rey, Puerto Rico
Municipality of San Juan